The Mechelen Toy Museum is a Toy Museum\ situated in the Nekkerspoel hamlet in Mechelen, Belgium, is a museum containing a unique collection of past and contemporary toys on a total surface of 7,000 m2. The museum was founded in April 1982, and since 1998 it is a recognized museum. The permanent collection is subdivided in the following categories:

 Circus and kermesse
 Construction toys
 Creative and educational toys
 Stuffed toys
 Mechanical and iron toys
 Optical and sound-making toys
 Puppets
 Puzzles and board games
 Soldiers
 Toys around the world
 Traditional child games and Pieter Bruegel
 Trains
 Transport in miniature

Apart from that there are also changing exhibitions. The museum also has an educational service with school programmes.

References

External links 
 Official website

Museums established in 1982
Toy museums
1982 establishments in Belgium
Mechelen